North East High School may refer to:

North East High School (Kansas) — Arma, Kansas
North East High School (Maryland) — North East, Maryland
North East High School (Pennsylvania) — North East, Pennsylvania

See also 
Northeast High School (disambiguation)
Northeastern High School (disambiguation)